The Toledo Assembly Complex is a  automotive factory complex located in Toledo, Ohio. Now owned by Stellantis North America, sections of the facility have operated as an automobile assembly plant since 1910, originally for Willys-Overland. The Toledo complex has assembled Jeeps since the 1940s, and comprises two factories: Toledo North and Toledo South, which itself includes the Stickney Plant and the Parkway Annex.

FCA (the predecessor of Stellantis NA) announced that the Toledo Machining Plant would assemble the power electronics module and components for the Jeep Wrangler Plug-in Hybrid which was launched in 2020.

Toledo South 

The "Toledo South Assembly Plant" is the original Jeep CJ assembly factory. It was rebuilt for manufacture of the JK Wrangler for Jeep, starting on August 28, 2006. The plant actually consists of two interconnected units, the "Stickney Plant" (4000 Stickney Ave) and the "Parkway Annex" (1000 Jeep Parkway). In recent years, basic assembly and painting of the Jeep Wrangler has been done in the Parkway facility. The antiquated arrangement at the old operation included operations spread through a disorganized array of buildings which required that vehicles and components be moved through multiple building levels. Final assembly of vehicles took place at Stickney, but facility constraints required that bodies first be painted at Parkway and then moved through tunnels and across bridges to reach the assembly line. Both the Stickney and Parkway sites were replaced by Toledo Supplier Park in 2007.

Stickney
The Stickney Plant was opened in 1942 by Autolite and sold to Kaiser-Jeep in 1964. It was used as a machining and engine plant until 1981, when it was converted for vehicle production by American Motors Corporation (AMC). It began producing the Jeep Grand Wagoneer that year through 1991 when final assembly of the Wrangler was moved there. In 1987, when Chrysler acquired AMC, it was renamed Toledo Assembly Plant.

Parkway

The Parkway Annex was opened in 1904 as a bicycle factory. Its use as an automobile assembly plant dates from 1910, when it was purchased by Willys-Overland. The plant began producing the Jeep in the 1940s and was renamed the Toledo Assembly Plant when Chrysler purchased American Motors (AMC) in 1987. Basic assembly and painting of the Jeep Cherokee (1983-2000) and building bodies and painting of the Jeep Wrangler was done at the Parkway plant through 2006, when it was closed. Jeep Wrangler assembly was completed at the Stickney plant from 1993 until the Toledo Supplier Park opened in 2006 for the 2007 model.

The Parkway plant included landmark smokestacks spelling out "Overland" in bricks. It was home to military Jeep production, as well as the Jeep museum. One third of the plant was demolished in 2002, including the former museum, and the remainder is being demolished. Two of the three "Overland" smokestacks, a Toledo landmark since 1915, were demolished on June 18, 2007. In 2010 the site was acquired by the Toledo–Lucas County Port Authority was redeveloped as an industrial park which now includes a new Dana facility producing Jeep axles and a Detroit Manufacturing Systems plant producing instrument clusters.   The remaining stack, left alone by Chrysler LLC, was dedicated in August 2013 with a plaque honoring the former plants' numerous workers.

Toledo Supplier Park
Toledo Supplier Park opened in 2007 by DaimlerChrysler to produce the new Jeep Wrangler. The name comes from the two on-site suppliers who make different parts for the Wrangler. There is Mobis North America (formerly OMMC) owned by Hyundai Mobis, which assembles the chassis, axles and power train, and KUKA Toledo Production Operations (KTPO), a wholly owned subsidiary of KUKA Systems North America LLC, which operates the body shop; both employ their own employees and control their own operations. While the suppliers may make most of the parts, final assembly is done by Chrysler. The Toledo Supplier Park sits on the same site as the Stickney Plant. The Jeep Wrangler JK was produced at this plant, until it was retooled to build the 2019 Jeep Gladiator (JT).

Toledo North
The "Toledo North Assembly Plant" was opened in 2001, building the unibody Jeep Liberty. The plant employs almost 7,000 workers. Production of the all-new 2014 Jeep Cherokee (KL) commenced at the Plant in 2013. In 2017, production of the Cherokee KL was moved to the Belvidere Assembly Plant in Illinois, and the Toledo North Assembly Plant retooled to begin producing the 2018 Jeep Wrangler (JL) Series.

Vehicles produced

Current 
Jeep Wrangler (1993–present), 2.8 liter diesel included
Jeep Wrangler Unlimited (2004–present), 2.8 liter diesel included
Jeep Gladiator (2019-present)

Past 

1945–1986: Jeep CJ
1946–1965: Willys Jeep Station Wagon
1962–1988: Jeep Gladiator
1963–1991: Jeep Grand Wagoneer
1974–1983: Jeep Cherokee
1984–2001: Jeep Cherokee/Wagoneer
1985–1992: Jeep Comanche
1994–1996: Dodge Dakota
2002–2012: Jeep Liberty/Cherokee
2007–2011: Dodge Nitro
2013-2017: Jeep Cherokee

References

External links

 
Toledo Assembly Plants at Allpar.com

American Motors
Chrysler factories
Motor vehicle assembly plants in Ohio
Economy of Toledo, Ohio
Buildings and structures in Toledo, Ohio